Giorgi Janelidze (born 25 September 1989) is Georgian football player. He currently plays for Shukura Kobuleti as a midfielder in Georgia.

International career
Giorgi Janelidze made his debut in a 2–0 friendly match against the Moldova national football team on 11 June 2011.

Honours

Club
 Dinamo Tbilisi
Georgian League: 2013–14
Georgian Cup: 2014
Super Cup: 2014

 Wit Georgia
Georgian Cup: 2010
Super Cup: 2010, Runner-up 2011

External links
 Player profile at uefa.com
 

1989 births
Living people
Footballers from Georgia (country)
Expatriate footballers from Georgia (country)
Georgia (country) international footballers
Georgia (country) under-21 international footballers
Association football midfielders
FC WIT Georgia players
FC Neftekhimik Nizhnekamsk players
FC Dinamo Tbilisi players
FC Sioni Bolnisi players
FC Kolkheti-1913 Poti players
FC Dinamo Batumi players
FC Torpedo Kutaisi players
FC Telavi players
FC Shukura Kobuleti players
Erovnuli Liga players
Expatriate sportspeople from Georgia (country) in Russia
Expatriate footballers in Russia